Harry Austin Kitson (17 June 1874 – 30 November 1951) was a male tennis player from South Africa who won a gold medal at the men's doubles event at the 1912 Summer Olympics.

Tennis career
Kitson competed in the singles and doubles events at the 1908 Summer Olympics in London. In the singles event he had a bye in the first round and lost in straight sets to George Caridia in the second round. In the doubles he was partnered by Victor Gauntlett and reached the quarterfinals where Clement Cazalet and Charles P. Dixon proved too strong.  Kitson was more successful at the 1912 Summer Olympics in Stockholm winning two medals. He won the gold medal in the men's doubles event together with Charles Lindhurst Winslow, defeating the Austrian team Arthur Zborzil / Fritz Pipes  in the final. In the men's singles tournament he won a silver medal after losing in the final to his doubles partner in four sets.

Kitson won the South African Championships in 1905, 1908, 1911 and 1913 and was runner–up in 1909 and 1910 to respectively Reginald Doherty and Anthony Wilding.

References

External links

Olympics profile

1874 births
1951 deaths
South African male tennis players
English emigrants to South Africa
Olympic tennis players of South Africa
Tennis players at the 1908 Summer Olympics
Tennis players at the 1912 Summer Olympics
Olympic gold medalists for South Africa
Olympic silver medalists for South Africa
Olympic medalists in tennis
Medalists at the 1912 Summer Olympics